Pinus douglasiana is a species of evergreen conifer in the family Pinaceae.
It is found only in Mexico.

A common name is Douglas pine, but that name is often applied to the more widespread species Pseudotsuga menziesii which is also known as Douglas fir.

Description
Pinus douglasiana is typically a tall tree, up to 45 meters in height, with a single strait trunk up to 100 cm in diameter at the base. In mature trees the trunk is often clear of branches for 2/3 of the tree's height. The crown is pyramidal in young trees, becoming rounded in older trees, and varying from dense to open. In young trees and new branches the bark is smooth and red-brown. As trees mature the bark becomes rough and scaly, and divided into large irregular plates by deep fissures.

Habitat and range
Pinus douglasiana inhabits the mountains of western and central Mexico, where it grows between 1100 and 2700 meters elevation.

It is found in the southern Sierra Madre Occidental up to the crest of the mountains along the border of Sinaloa and Durango, in the western Trans-Mexican Volcanic Belt in the states of Nayarit, Jalisco, Michoacán, México and Morelos, and locally in the Sierra Madre del Sur of Guerrero and Oaxaca.

It is often found with other pines, including Pinus pseudostrobus, Pinus herrerae, Pinus leiophylla, Pinus lawsonii, and Pinus ayacahuite in the southern part of its range. At lower elevations it is sometimes found with Pinus oocarpa, and with Pinus devoniana on drier sites.
In some areas oaks (Quercus spp.) are co-dominant canopy trees, especially in areas which have been logged of pines. In high-elevation, high-rainfall sites in the Sierra Madre Occidental, it occurs with species of Abies, Picea, and Cupressus lusitanica.

It is parasitized by the mistletoe Cladocolea cupulata the dwarf mistletoe Arceuthobium globosum subsp. grandicaule.

Conservation and use
The tree is harvested commercially for timber. It is assessed as Least Concern in the IUCN Red List.

References

douglasiana
Least concern plants
Flora of the Sierra Madre Occidental
Flora of the Trans-Mexican Volcanic Belt
Endemic flora of Mexico
Flora of the Sierra Madre del Sur
Taxonomy articles created by Polbot